Streptomyces yangpuensis is a Gram-positive bacterium species from the genus of Streptomyces which has been isolated from soil in Shanghai in China.

See also 
 List of Streptomyces species

References

External links 

Type strain of Streptomyces yangpuensis at BacDive -  the Bacterial Diversity Metadatabase

yangpuensis
Bacteria described in 2016